Charlotte Beatrice Louise Feltham (22 March 1935 – 25 May 2020) was a member of the House of Commons of Canada from 1988 to 1993. She was a businessperson by career.

She was elected in the 1988 federal election at the Wild Rose electoral district for the Progressive Conservative party. She served in the 34th Canadian Parliament but lost to Myron Thompson of the Reform Party in the 1993 federal election. She died in Calgary on 25 May 2020.

References

External links
 

1935 births
2020 deaths
Members of the House of Commons of Canada from Alberta
Progressive Conservative Party of Canada MPs
Women members of the House of Commons of Canada
Women in Alberta politics
People from Newfoundland (island)